Harm is a village in Harm Rural District, Juyom District, Larestan County, Fars Province, Iran. At the 2006 census, its population was 1,759, in 342 families.

References 

Populated places in Larestan County